Madman of the People is an American sitcom television series created by Chris Cluess and Stu Kreisman, that aired on NBC from September 22, 1994, to June 17, 1995. It was scheduled in the Thursday 9:30 timeslot, part of Must See TV.

Madman of the People was produced by Spelling Television.

Synopsis
The series stars character actor Dabney Coleman as Jack "Madman" Buckner, an outspoken newspaper columnist who had written a popular column, Madman of the People, in Your Times magazine for 30 years.  The premise of the show involves Buckner's daughter, Meg (Cynthia Gibb), being brought in by the publisher to bring Buckner's column into the 1990s.

Cast
Dabney Coleman as Jack "Madman" Buckner
Concetta Tomei as Delia Buckner
Cynthia Gibb as Meg Buckner
John Ales as Dylan Buckner
Amy Aquino as Sasha Danziger
Craig Bierko as B.J. Cooper

Episodes

Reception
Though the series earned good ratings, ranking 12th for the season with a 14.9 average household share, it was pulled from NBC's schedule in January 1995 and cancelled before the 1994-95 season was officially over. It is one of the highest-rated 1st-year shows to ever get cancelled during its initial season, according to classictvhits.com. NBC soured on the show because it lost a considerable portion of its lead-in audience from Seinfeld and was also hindering the then-freshman hit drama ER. NBC noticed the early success of Friends and decided to re-shuffle its lineup to put that show in the 9:30 PM EST spot, leading to one of the most dominant programming blocs in TV history. The last two episodes aired in June 1995, during the period that was formerly called "Burn-off Theatre", when in the pre-reality TV era networks would make more money airing new episodes of already-doomed shows than it would for repeats from most shows that would return the following fall.

When it first aired, Madman of the People was considered by critics as one of "the fall season's least likable new comedies" and not deserving of its comedy label.

Inter-series continuity

Episode 7, "Birthday in the Big House", was promoted to directly tie in with the same night's episodes of both Friends and Mad About You.  All three series were set in New York City and all aired on NBC on Thursday evenings.  Accordingly, a continuing plot thread ran through all three shows broadcast on November 3, 1994: a city-wide blackout caused by the character of Jamie in the Mad About You episode "Pandora's Box" continued through to the Madman of the People episode "Birthday in the Big House", and concluded in the Friends episode "The One With The Blackout".  None of the characters crossed over from one series to another in these episodes; only the details of the blackout situation were used to create a crossover effect.  (The series Seinfeld, which also aired on Thursday evenings on NBC and was also set in New York, chose not to participate in this crossover event.)

References

External links
 

1994 American television series debuts
1995 American television series endings
1990s American sitcoms
1990s American workplace comedy television series
English-language television shows
NBC original programming
Television series about journalism
Television series by CBS Studios
Television shows set in New York City